Filibacter limicola  is a Gram-negative bacterium from the genus of Filibacter which has been isolated from lake sediment from the English Lake District in Blelham Tarn in England.

References

Further reading

External links
Type strain of Filibacter limicola at BacDive -  the Bacterial Diversity Metadatabase	

Bacillales
Bacteria described in 1985